Brian Lindsay Turner  (born 4 March 1944 in Dunedin) is a New Zealand poet and author. He played hockey for New Zealand in the 1960s; senior cricket in Dunedin and Wellington; and was a veteran road cyclist of note. His mountaineering experience includes an ascent of a number of major peaks including Aoraki / Mount Cook.

His writing includes columns and reviews for daily and weekly newspapers, articles, given radio talks, and written scripts for TV programme. His publications include cricket books with his brother Glenn Turner, the former NZ cricket captain, essays, books on fishing, the high country, and eight collections of poetry. His other brother is golfer Greg Turner.

 Turner lives in Oturehua, a town of 30–40 people in the Maniototo region of Central Otago. He moved there in late 1999.

Awards and recognition

Source:
1979 – Commonwealth Poetry Prize
1985 – J.C. Reid Memorial Prize
1993 – Montana New Zealand Book Award for Poetry
1997 – appointed Canterbury Writer in Residence
2003 – appointed Te Mata Estate New Zealand Poet Laureate
2009 – Prime Minister's Award for Literary Achievement in Poetry
2010 – Poetry Award for Just This at the New Zealand Post Book Awards
2020 – appointed an Officer of the New Zealand Order of Merit, for services to literature and poetry, in the 2020 Queen's Birthday Honours

Selected works

Poetry
Ladders of Rain (John McIndoe, 1978)
Ancestors (John McIndoe, 1981)
Listening to the River (John McIndoe, 1983)
Bones (John McIndoe, 1985)
All That Blue Can Be (John McIndoe, 1989)
Beyond (John McIndoe, 1992)
Taking Off (Victoria University Press, 2001)
Footfall (Random House, 2005)
Just This (Victoria University Press, 2009)
Inside Outside (Victoria University Press, 2011)
Elemental: Central Otago Poems(Godwit/Random House, 2012)
Night Fishing (Victoria University Press, 2016)

Memoir
Somebodies and Nobodies (Random House, 2002)

References

External links
Interview with Brian Turner, from New Zealand Listener of 5–11 March 2005, Vol 197 no 3382

1944 births
Living people
New Zealand poets
New Zealand Poets Laureate
New Zealand male poets
New Zealand male field hockey players
Writers from Dunedin
Officers of the New Zealand Order of Merit